Cecilia Häll (born 10 June 1978) is a Swedish actress. She was married to the actor Joakim Nätterqvist and together they have a child.

Filmography
 Tre kronor (1996-99)
 Lilla Jönssonligan och cornflakeskuppen (1996)
 Beck – Spår i mörker (1997)
 Kommissionen (2005)
 100 Code (2015)

References

External links

1978 births
Swedish film actresses
Living people
Swedish television actresses
20th-century Swedish women
21st-century Swedish women